Wandering (stylized in all capitals) is an extended play (EP) marketed as the fifth single of Japanese boy group JO1. It is also the first single of the group that features double lead tracks, namely  and "Prologue". The latter was used as the ending theme song of the anime series Boruto: Naruto Next Generations. Consisting of a total of seven songs, the EP single was released digitally by Lapone Entertainment on December 13, 2021, while the four physical editions were released on December 15, 2021. It features the participation of various Japanese and South Korean producers such as Alive Knob, Full8loom, and others.

As part of the promotion, two B-side tracks were released as a digital single prior to the release of the EP single. "Run&Go", used as the theme song for Kit Kat Japan commercial, was released on September 15, while "We Alright" was pre-released on December 6. Wandering became the fifth single of the group that earned number one position on the Oricon Singles Chart and their first single that surpassed a half million copies sold in its release week according to Billboard Japan. It is also JO1's first release to be certified Double Platinum by the Recording Industry Association of Japan.

Background and release 
On September 1, 2021, two weeks after releasing their fourth EP single Stranger, JO1 announced that they would release a new song titled "Prologue", to be used as the ending song for the anime series Boruto: Naruto Next Generations starting October 10 and released on the next day. It was followed by the release of "Run&Go" as part of Kit Kat Japan's campaign two weeks later. On October 9, Lapone Entertainment announced  that member Sukai Kinjo, who had missed the group's first performance with a live audience at the KCON World Premiere: The Triangle, a joint concert with other post-Produce 101 Japan groups, would suspend his activities after being diagnosed with adjustment disorder and the group would continue their activities as 10 members. On the next day, JO1 announced that their fifth EP single, Wandering, was set to be released on December 15, with double lead tracks,  and "Prologue". They also mentioned that prior to his break, Kinjo had managed to participate in the recording of the single except for the song "Oasis".

Wandering was said to contain the message saying that "it's okay to rest, it's okay to stand still, let's move forward slowly". The EP single consists of a total of seven songs that were released into five different editions; a digital special edition and four physical editions, which includes an anime edition with cover featuring characters from Boruto. Each physical edition consists of four tracks with "Bokura no Kisetsu" and "Prologue" as the common tracks. The limited edition A comes with a DVD bundle consisting of a variety segment with the members called JO1: Find the Memory. The limited edition B and the normal edition come with a photo booklet and a CD-only, respectively. The special edition includes all songs in the EP single.

Lead tracks 
The first lead track "Bokura no Kisetsu" is described as a "lyrical and gentle winter song". It was composed in the key of G-sharp major, 113 beats per minute with a running time of 3 minutes and 31 seconds. The song was pre-released on November 22, 2021, supported by a week-long Line Music campaign. The music video was released two days later and directed by Hidejin Kato, who had worked with the group for performance videos of "Icarus" and "Freedom" from their previous single. The song debuted at number 22 and 21 on the Billboard Japan Hot 100 and Oricon Combined Singles Chart, respectively, before eventually peaked atop both charts after the single released. "Bokura no Kisetsu" was performed for the first time on television on the annual FNS Music Festival on December 1. JO1 then performed the song at the 2021 MTV Video Music Awards Japan and the 2021 Mnet Asian Music Awards where they received the Best Dance Video for their previous lead track, "Real", and the Best Asian Artist (Japan) award, respectively. The song was also performed in several music shows, such as Shibuya Note, Utacon, and Music Fair.

The second lead track "Prologue" is described as a medium-tempo ballad which expresses the idea that "it's okay to be slow, it's okay to stop, it's okay to hold hands and start walking together, and that determination marks the beginning of our journey". The song was produced by Japanese producer , who has worked with artists such as BTS, TVXQ, Exile, Koda Kumi, and others. It was composed in the key of F major, 94 beats per minute with a running time of 3 minutes and 37 seconds. "Prologue" debuted at number 49 on Billboard Japan Hot 100 and charted for six weeks on its Hot Animation chart. A studio version video of the song was released on December 10 as part of a week-long commemoration of the group's second anniversary.

Promotion 
JO1 started the promotion for Wandering by performing "Run&Go" for the first time at the Best Hits Kayousai on November 11, 2021, about two months after the song's digital release. Beside "Run&Go", three other songs from the single, "Bokura no Kisetsu", "Prologue", and "Never Ending Story", were performed for the first time at the group's first live concert, 2021 JO1 Live "Open the Door", at the Makuhari Messe on November 19–21.

On December 24, JO1 then held a commemorative Christmas live for the single at the Tokyo Dome City Hall. A total of 400 fans were invited to the event by lottery among the purchasers of Wandering. The group performed "Prologue", "We Alright", "Bokura no Kisetsu" as well as "Happy Merry Christmas" from their first studio album The Star. JO1 later opened an exhibition at the Gallery AaMo in Tokyo Dome City Hall the next day until January 25, 2022, to commemorate the EP single's release and the group's second anniversary. "Bokura no Kisetsu" was played as the background music of Tokyo Dome City Hall's main tree winter illumination starting on December 15.

#Find_the_JO1 campaign
#Find_the_JO1 is an out-of-home advertising campaign launched by JO1 and Lapone Entertainment in 47 prefectures of Japan, with one location in each prefecture except Aichi with two different locations, starting on December 6, 2021. On December 2, the official Twitter account of JO1 posted a mysterious tweet consisting the hashtag, a date "2021.12.6 -", and an image of 48 mysterious codes which led fans assumed they were coordinate numbers of train stations across Japan. Three days later, an image of colored triangles scattered in 48 locations and arranged as if they were on a map of Japan was released, with eleven of the triangles were in official colors of JO1 members and indicated their hometowns. Fans had been posting tweets with the hashtag and photos of the advertisements taken from those locations since the early morning of December 6, which led the hashtag trended on Twitter. The most notable location was Kurihama Station in Kanagawa which station code is JO1. The black lines on the posters became the source of various theories among the fans, and they began to discuss its meaning. The black lines were actually a part of the group's message to their fans, which could be read if the posters were put together in the order of the lyrics attached. On December 11, all advertisements were up, and an image of the completed message saying  was posted on the group's official Twitter.

According to Advertimes, the campaign was made with the idea of "JO1 goes to see fans in 47 prefectures who can not see them due to the COVID-19 pandemic". Advertising companies Dentsu and Ad Brain were in charge of its planning and production. In interview with Natalie, a representative of Lapone Entertainment explained that the campaign was made to express the group's and their gratitude to the fans for their support and warm messages in the light of the announcement regarding Kinjo's absent. They also stated that the "we" in the message had included JO1, fans, and Kinjo who was temporarily not together with them.

Commercial performance 
Wandering debuted at number one on the Oricon Daily Singles Chart with 298,106 copies sold, and eventually managed to be the group's fifth consecutive number-one on the Weekly Singles Chart with over 430,000 copies sold. It earned JO1 their highest first week physical and combined sales up to then, surpassing their debut single Protostar. The single also set a new personal record on the Billboard Japan Top Singles Sales, topping the chart with over a half million copies sold in its first week, and subsequently became JO1's first single to be certified Double Platinum by the Recording Industry Association of Japan. Due to its release date didn't fall in the aggregation period in 2021, Wandering ranked in sixth place on the Billboard Japans mid-year single sales chart of 2022 with 533,632 physical copies sold.

Track listing 
"Bokura no Kisetsu" and "Prologue" are common track 1 and 2 for limited edition A, limited edition B, and normal edition.

Charts

Weekly charts

Monthly charts

Year-end charts

Certifications

Release history

References

JO1 songs
2021 songs
2021 singles
Japanese-language songs
Oricon Weekly number-one singles
Billboard Japan Hot 100 number-one singles